Ein-Mensch-Theater ( "human being") is a German expression for a traveling theater, within the owner is writer, director, stage designer, performer and sometimes even his own tour manager in one person.

Origin
The term was coined by Natias Neutert after his performance (The poet stumbles into the open) at Schauspielhaus Bochum during a panel discussion with Peter Zadek

Goal
His intention was going to replace the worn and partial label one-man show by a label under which both males and females could find equally.

Exponents
Dario Fo, Robert Kreis, Johnny Melville, Natias Neutert and Franca Rame became famous exponents as this type of theater in Europe.

See also
 Commedia dell'arte
 Monodrama
 Monologue

References 

Theatre in Germany
Theatrical genres
1978 neologisms
German words and phrases
20th-century German literature